Kim Saeng-min (born June 2, 1973) is a South Korean television presenter and comedian. He is well known for a presenter on the TV show Go! Video Travel, TV Animal Farm and Entertainment Weekly

Filmography

Variety Programs

Awards and nominations

References

1973 births
Living people
South Korean male comedians
South Korean television presenters
Seoul Institute of the Arts alumni